Taylor is a town in Geneva and Houston counties in the U.S. state of Alabama. Taylor was first settled in the 1870s, named after an early family that helped secure the first post office. It was not incorporated until almost a century later in June 1967. It is part of the Dothan, Alabama Metropolitan Statistical Area. At the 2010 census the population was 2,375, up from 1,898 in 2000.

Geography
Taylor is located in western Houston County at  (31.168331, -85.468016). A rural portion of the town extends west into Geneva County. Taylor is bordered to the northeast by Dothan, to the southeast by Rehobeth, and to the southwest by Malvern. Alabama State Route 52 (Hartford Highway) passes through the northern part of Taylor, leading northeast  to the center of Dothan and southwest  to Slocomb.

Demographics

2000 census
At the 2000 census there were 1,898 people, 699 households, and 552 families living in the town. The racial makeup of the town was 93.05% White, 3.79% Black or African American, 0.79% Native American, 0.26% Asian, 0.74% from other races, and 1.37% from two or more races. 1.11% of the population were Hispanic or Latino of any race.
Of the 699 households 47.2% had children under the age of 18 living with them, 61.9% were married couples living together, 12.3% had a female householder with no husband present, and 21.0% were non-families. 18.3% of households were one person and 4.6% were one person aged 65 or older. The average household size was 2.72 and the average family size was 3.09.

The age distribution was 31.7% under the age of 18, 7.6% from 18 to 24, 35.6% from 25 to 44, 17.9% from 45 to 64, and 7.2% 65 or older. The median age was 31 years. For every 100 females, there were 97.5 males. For every 100 females age 18 and over, there were 94.0 males.

The median household income was $40,664 and the median family income  was $44,181. Males had a median income of $32,401 versus $22,321 for females. The per capita income for the town was $16,327. About 8.7% of families and 9.9% of the population were below the poverty line, including 12.8% of those under age 18 and 10.6% of those age 65 or over.

2010 census
At the 2010 census there were 2,375 people, 835 households, and 639 families living in the town. The racial makeup of the town was 87.5% White, 7.2% Black or African American, 0.8% Native American, 0.1% Asian, 2.4% from other races, and 2.1% from two or more races. 5.2% of the population were Hispanic or Latino of any race.
Of the 835 households 43.0% had children under the age of 18 living with them, 53.8% were married couples living together, 18.2% had a female householder with no husband present, and 23.5% were non-families. 19.3% of households were one person and 6.1% were one person aged 65 or older. The average household size was 2.84 and the average family size was 3.22.

The age distribution was 31.6% under the age of 18, 8.2% from 18 to 24, 30.4% from 25 to 44, 22.1% from 45 to 64, and 7.8% 65 or older. The median age was 31.5 years. For every 100 females, there were 96.3 males. For every 100 females age 18 and over, there were 89.5 males.

The median household income was $43,603 and the median family income  was $49,500. Males had a median income of $31,795 versus $29,276 for females. The per capita income for the town was $16,833. About 16.9% of families and 21.0% of the population were below the poverty line, including 32.3% of those under age 18 and 10.5% of those age 65 or over.

2020 census

As of the 2020 United States census, there were 2,262 people, 752 households, and 534 families residing in the town.

References 

Towns in Geneva County, Alabama
Towns in Houston County, Alabama
Towns in Alabama
Dothan metropolitan area, Alabama
1789 establishments in the United States